The 1948 Cotton Bowl Classic was a post-season game between the SMU Mustangs and the Penn State Nittany Lions. The game was a struggle of yardage with the final score being decided on a missed extra point.

Background
SMU was coached by Matty Bell and led by Doak Walker, who was named All-American. SMU went unbeaten and had won the Southwest Conference championship.

Penn State was coached by Bob Higgins, who would retire after next season. They also went unbeaten as an Independent. Coincidentally, Higgins was the coach who had handed SMU their first bowl loss back in 1925.

Game summary
Doak Walker scored the first seven points of the game on a 53-yard touchdown pass to Paul Page. Later in the second quarter, Walker scored again, this time on a two-yard touchdown run as the extra point was missed. Penn State roared back with Larry Cooney's 38 yard touchdown catch from Elwood Petchel as the game was 13-7 at half time.

Wallace Triplett caught a touchdown pass from Petchel in the third quarter, but the extra point missed as the game was tied, 13-13. The game had no further points as Walker was limited to 75 yards combined and Penn State lost two fumbles.

Statistics

References

1947–48 NCAA football bowl games
1948
1948
1948
January 1948 sports events in the United States
Cotton Bowl